Covenant Christian High School is a private non-denominational Christian high school located in Indianapolis, Indiana.

History
Covenant Christian High School began in 1995 as a group of 16 freshmen meeting in the basement of Chapel Rock Christian Church on the west side of Indianapolis. Groundbreaking for the construction of a separate school building started in 1996 after a financial endowment from the locally based industrial technology firm Lastech. In 1997, the first classes were held in the building and the initial class graduated in 1999.

Awards
In March 2003, Covenant Christian High School was recognized by Christianity Today as the "Best Christian Place to Work" in the United States for the private schools category. The study was administered by the Best Christian Workplaces Institute and is the largest poll ever conducted on the attitudes of employees at Christian workplaces with more than 8,500 respondents. The school was also given exemplary accreditation by the Association of Christian Schools.

Athletics
Covenant Christian High School's mascot is the Warrior.  Sports teams include volleyball (women's and men's), softball, baseball, tennis (men's and women's), golf (men's and women's), basketball (men's and women's), soccer (men's and women's), men's football, co-ed swimming, co-ed track and field, and co-ed cross country.  Covenant Teams have advanced to the state finals in several sports, including, but not limited to, men's soccer, women's volleyball, and women's basketball.  In the fall of 2020, the Warriors football team won the IHSAA State Final in Class 1A. Covenant has won several other tournaments and championships.

See also
 List of high schools in Indiana

References

External links

Christian schools in Indiana
Private high schools in Indiana
Schools in Indianapolis
Educational institutions established in 1997
Nondenominational Christian schools in the United States
Christian organizations established in 1997
1997 establishments in Indiana
IHSAA Conference-Independent Schools
Circle City Conference schools